Robert Patterson Clark Wilson (August 8, 1834 – December 21, 1916) was a U.S. Representative from Missouri.

Born in Boonville, Missouri, Wilson moved with his parents to Platte County.
He attended William Jewell College, Liberty, Missouri, and was graduated from Centre College, Danville, Kentucky, in 1853.
He studied law.
He was admitted to the bar in 1854 and commenced practice in Seguin, Texas, in 1855.
He returned to Missouri in 1858.
He moved to Leavenworth, Kansas, in 1860.
He was a member of the first Kansas House of Representatives from March to June 4, 1861.
He returned to Missouri in 1861.
He served as member of the Missouri House of Representatives in 1871 and 1872 and served as Speaker of the Missouri House of Representatives both years.
He served as member of the Missouri State Senate in 1879 and 1880.
He served as delegate to the 1888 Democratic National Convention.
He served as president of the school board of Platte City, Missouri.

Wilson was elected as a Democrat to the Fifty-first Congress.
He was reelected to the Fifty-second Congress and served from December 2, 1889, to March 3, 1893.
He served as chairman of the Committee on Pensions (Fifty-second Congress).
He resumed the practice of his profession in Platte City, Missouri.
He died in Kansas City, Missouri, December 21, 1916.
He was interred in Marshall Cemetery, Platte City, Missouri.

References

1834 births
1916 deaths
People from Boonville, Missouri
People from Platte City, Missouri
Democratic Party members of the Kansas House of Representatives
Speakers of the Missouri House of Representatives
Democratic Party members of the Missouri House of Representatives
Missouri state senators
William Jewell College alumni
Centre College alumni
Democratic Party members of the United States House of Representatives from Missouri
19th-century American politicians